In the 1989 Volvo Open women's doubles tennis tournament, Sandra Cecchini and Mercedes Paz were the defending champions but only Paz competed that year with Tine Scheuer-Larsen.

Paz and Scheuer-Larsen won in the final 6–2, 7–5 against Sabrina Goleš and Katerina Maleeva.

Seeds
Champion seeds are indicated in bold text while text in italics indicates the round in which those seeds were eliminated.

 Mercedes Paz /  Tine Scheuer-Larsen (champions)
 Sabrina Goleš /  Katerina Maleeva (final)
 Cecilia Dahlman /  Simone Schilder (semifinals)
 Barbara Paulus /  Radka Zrubáková (semifinals)

Draw

External links
 1989 Volvo Open Women's Doubles draw

Women's Doubles
Doubles
1989 in Swedish women's sport